Paula Zabala Alvarez (born 26 January 1985) is a former professional tennis player from Colombia.

Biography
Born in Medellín, Zabala was based in the United States and played collegiate tennis for Florida International University.

As a professional player, she reached career-high rankings of 368 in singles and 312 in doubles. She won seven ITF titles, all in doubles. Her only WTA Tour main-draw appearance came at the 2010 Copa Colsanitas in Bogotá, where she competed as a singles wildcard and was beaten in the first round by Austria's Patricia Mayr.

Zabala played a Fed Cup doubles match for Colombia in 2010, partnering Karen Castiblanco in a win over the Bolivian pairing of María Fernanda Álvarez Terán and Maria Paula Deheza.

ITF Circuit finals

Singles: 2 (0–2)

Doubles: 13 (7–6)

References

External links
 
 
 

1985 births
Living people
Colombian female tennis players
Sportspeople from Medellín
FIU Panthers women's tennis players
20th-century Colombian women
21st-century Colombian women